Aadha Din Aadhee Raat is a 1977 Indian Hindi-language action film directed by Doondi. It was a remake of the 1972 Telugu film Manavudu Danavudu.

Cast
Vinod Khanna ... Dr. Gopal / Jagan
Shabana Azmi ... Dr. Radha
Asha Parekh ... Seeta
Jayshree T. ... Laxmi
Jalal Agha ... Raju
Prem Chopra ... Gulshan
Ranjeet ... Patel
Om Shivpuri ... Kedar

Soundtrack
Songs were written by Anand Bakshi and their music was composed by the duo Laxmikant Pyarelal.

References

External links
 

1977 films
1970s Hindi-language films
1977 action films
Hindi remakes of Telugu films
Films scored by Laxmikant–Pyarelal
Indian action drama films
Hindi-language action films